Cordel Hyde (born 20 August 1973) is a Belizean politician. He is the current Deputy Prime Minister of Belize since 16 November 2020.  He is a member of the People's United Party, he has represented the Lake Independence constituency in the Belize House since 2015. He currently serves as deputy leader of the People's United Party.

Personal 
Hyde is an alumnus of St. John's College, a junior college in Belize City. He went on to receive a bachelor's degree in English communications from a university in New York. He formerly served as Minister of Education during his first term. He continued to serve the people of  his constituency until 2014, when his son was diagnosed with a deadly cancer. His son died later that year in New York, he returned to Belize to work for his family's business. In 2014 Hyde announced his return to politics, defeating the incumbent in the 2015 elections and reclaiming his old seat.

Hyde is the son of prominent Belizean journalist Evan X Hyde.

References

External links 

 People's Unity Party bio

1973 births
Living people
People's United Party politicians
Deputy Prime Ministers of Belize
Members of the Belize House of Representatives for Lake Independence
Belizean lawyers
21st-century Belizean politicians
Louisiana State University alumni